Edwin Musiime is a Ugandan  entrepreneur, pastor, author and formerly a media personality who stepped down from the property show to focus on his executive roles. He hosted Good Morning Uganda on Uganda Broadcasting Corporation TV (2006–2014) and hosted The Property Show on NTV Uganda for 10years. He serves as the President of the Chamber of Young Entrepreneurs Uganda. He was recently appointed as UK-Uganda convention ambassador.

Musiime is the chairman of Olim Group after rebranding from Crest Group, an investment firm with interests in Real estate, Media, and manufacturing. He is the founder of Dwell Ministries Uganda that has affiliations with Transformation City Church Australia.

Early life and education 
Musiime was born on July 15, 1982, at Nsambya Hospital in Kampala, and is the second born in a family of seven children, born to Charles Njuyarwo and Leticia Namukwaya. He attended Namilyango Junior School for his primary education and later joined St. Joseph's Nagalaama for his secondary education. He holds a bachelor's degree in mass communication from Makerere University.

Career 
In 2001, Musiime joined the Daily Monitor as a features writer and he juggled this alongside being a radio personality on Kampala FM, a TV host and programs director on Uganda Television (now Uganda Broadcasting Corporation TV). In 2013, he resigned from UBC where he held the position of Quality Assurance Manager and Head Religious programming and then founded Sun media production house that produces and supplies broadcast content to numerous TV channels in Africa including the NTV Uganda's Property show. The show is aired in Uganda, Ghana, Rwanda, South Africa and Tanzania. He is also the founder and chairman of the Uganda Homes Expo, a real estate events expo. It was from this show that Musiime launched the Homex brand.

As a public speaker, Musiime has presented at numerous events including the Transformational Conference California in 2017, the Kingdom Network Forum in London 2014, Leadership conference in Nairobi Kenya 2017 and the Kingdom Network conference in 2017 at the Kampala Serena Hotel. 
He was also one of the guest speakers at the Author's Forum, previously held at the National Theatre, and the Riot Conference in 2015 at Miracle Centre Rubaga.

In 2018, he founded The Chamber of Young Entrepreneurs Uganda a private initiative with among youth to inspire a sustainable Entrepreneurship culture.

Other considerations
On March 5, 2020, he was appointed  as the  UK-Uganda Convention ambassador. He is the author of The Joseph Economic Transformation. He is the founder of Abra Foundation (a non-profit organisation that supports need He is the founder of Abra Foundation (a non-profitable foundation that fosters social change and creating economic opportunities through providing Education, Health, Youth and Community empowerment programs).

Personal life 
Edwin is married to Christabel Nansubuga Musiime and the couple has three children.

References 

Ugandan radio presenters
Ugandan television presenters
1982 births
Living people